Syed Muhammad Mahfooz Mashahdi is a Pakistani politician who was a Member of the Provincial Assembly of the Punjab, from May 2013 to May 2018.

Early life and education
He was born on 1 January 1954 in Mandi Bahauddin.

He has received matriculation level education.

Political career

He was elected to the Provincial Assembly of the Punjab as a candidate of Pakistan Muslim League (Nawaz) from Constituency PP-120 (Mandi Bahauddin-V) in 2013 Pakistani general election.

References

Living people
Punjab MPAs 2013–2018
1954 births
Pakistan Muslim League (N) politicians